We Need a Little Christmas is the fifth Christmas album by American pop singer Andy Williams (and his forty-second studio album overall) that was released by Unison Music in 1995. It gives an adult contemporary treatment to songs that Williams had previously recorded for 1963's The Andy Williams Christmas Album ("Away In A Manger", "The Christmas Song (Chestnuts Roasting On An Open Fire)", "It's The Most Wonderful Time Of The Year", "Silent Night"), 1965's Merry Christmas ("Mary's Little Boy Child"), 1974's Christmas Present ("Angels We Have Heard On High", "Hark! The Herald Angels Sing", "I Heard the Bells on Christmas Day", "What Child Is This"), and 1990's I Still Believe in Santa Claus ("I'll Be Home for Christmas") and includes three songs that Williams had not recorded before. In a brief note on the back of the jewel case Williams writes, "These all-new recordings feature fresh, innovative arrangements of some of my favorite carols. I felt like I was singing them for the very first time." 

The Recording Industry Association of America awarded the album Gold certification for sales of 500,000 units on February 2, 1998.

Track listing 

 "Mary's Little Boy Child" (Jester Hairston) – 4:14
"I'll Be Home for Christmas" (Kim Gannon, Walter Kent, Buck Ram) – 3:21
 "Up on the House Top" (Benjamin Hanby) – 3:08
 "Away in a Manger" (traditional) – 3:01
"We Need a Little Christmas" (Jerry Herman)  – 3:33
 Angel Medley – 4:40  a. "Angels We Have Heard On High" (traditional)  b. "Hark! The Herald Angels Sing" (Felix Mendelssohn, Charles Wesley)
 "The Christmas Song (Chestnuts Roasting on an Open Fire)" (Mel Tormé, Robert Wells) – 4:02
 "It's the Most Wonderful Time of the Year" (Edward Pola, George Wyle) – 3:34
 "Jolly Old St. Nicholas" (traditional) – 2:33
 "I Heard the Bells on Christmas Day" (John Baptiste Calkin, Henry Wadsworth Longfellow) – 3:08
 "What Child Is This" (William Chatterton Dix) – 4:10
 "Silent Night" (Franz Xaver Gruber; Joseph Mohr) – 5:29

Song information

Of the three songs on the album that Williams had not recorded before, "Jolly Old Saint Nicholas" is the least traceable in origin, although it is estimated that it was written in the late 19th century. The year in which "Up on the House Top" was written is also uncertain, but because its creator, Benjamin Hanby, was in his mid-30s when he died in 1867, the 1850s or 1860s is the estimate. The third newcomer, "We Need a Little Christmas", comes from the 1966 Broadway musical Mame.

Personnel
From the liner notes for the original album:

 Production
Don Boyer - producer; background vocal arrangement/children's vocal arrangement (track 6)
Pat Coil - arranger (tracks 5, 7, 9, 10)
John Darnall - lead vocal engineer (except as noted)
Jim Falzone - editor
Mike Frazier - lead vocal engineer (tracks 1, 5, 9); additional engineering
Tommy Greer - arranger (track 12)
Don Hart - string arrangement/conductor (tracks 5, 7, 11, 12), brass arrangement/conductor (tracks 1, 5, 10), string conductor (tracks 1, 4, 10)
Peter Jacobs - children's vocal arrangement/conductor (tracks 5, 6, 8)
David Jahnsen - additional engineering
John Jaszcz - mixing (tracks 5, 6, 8)
Sandy Jenkins - additional engineering
Pete Martinez - additional engineering
Blair Masters - arranger (tracks 2, 8, 11)
John Mayfield - string engineer (except as noted)
Gary Oldenbroek - associate producer
Dennis Patton - arranger (tracks 1, 3, 4, 6)
Daryl Roudebush - additional engineering
Dan Rudin - mixing (except as noted)
Roger Ryan - adult choir contractor/conductor (track 6)
Chris Sabold - string engineer (tracks 2, 6, 8)
Rich Schirmer - additional engineering
David Schober - additional engineering
Shaun Shankel - additional engineering
J. Daniel Smith - background vocal arrangement (track 6), string arrangement/conductor (tracks 2, 6, 8)
Bert Stevens - additional engineering
Hank Williams - mastering
Dave Williamson - background vocal arrangement/conductor (track 3), string arrangement (track 1)
Don Wyrtzen - string arrangement (tracks 4, 10)

 Musicians
Mark Baldwin - guitar (track 11)
Eric Darken - percussion (tracks 2, 5, 7, 8, 10, 12); snare (track 2)
Gota Yashiki's Groove Activator - drum loop (track 3)
Barry Green - trombone
Mike Haynes - trumpet and flugelhorn
Tom Hemby - guitar (track 10)
Jim Hoke - harmonica (track 2)
Sam Levine - alto saxophone (track 3), saxophone
Carol McClure - harp (except tracks 2, 6, 8)
Craig Nelson - bass (tracks 6, 8); acoustic bass (tracks 2, 9)
Dan Rudin - additional percussion (track 7)
Pam Sixfin - violin solo (tracks 7, 11)
Chester Thompson - drums (tracks 5, 7, 8)

 Design
Kevin Majeski - art direction
Jim Lersch - photography
Susan Hulme, Barnes & Co. - graphic design

 Vocalists
Andy Williams - lead vocal
William Cannon - adult choir
Da'dra Crawford - background vocals (track 6)
Steve Crawford - background vocals (track 6)
Laurie Eason - children's choir
Christi Ebenhock - children's choir
Juanita Edwards - adult choir
Gail Farrell - background vocals (track 3)
Elaina Foley - children's choir
Kara Foley - children's choir
Richard Forde - adult choir
Son Jones - adult choir
Bonnie Keen - background vocals (track 3)
Jason Laudadio - children's choir
Melissa Laudadio - children's choir
Marty McCall - background vocals (track 3)
Mindy Metzger - children's choir
Shandra Penix - adult choir
Tiffani Ransom - adult choir
Terita Redd - adult choir
Fatima Richardson - adult choir
Cindy Stuck - children's choir
Katie Stuck - children's choir
Randy Stuck - children's choir
Nee-C Walls - background vocals (track 6)
Dave Williamson - background vocals (track 3)
Christopher Willis - adult choir

 Strings (except tracks 2, 6, 8)
David Angell - violin
Monisa Angell - viola
John Catchings - cello
Bruce Christensen - viola
Joann Cruthirds - violin
David Davidson - violin
Carl Gorodetzky - violin, contractor
Jim Grosjean - viola
Anthony Lamarchina - cello
Lee Larrison - violin
Bob Mason - cello
Cate Myer - violin
Craig Nelson - bass
Randy Olson - violin
Pam Sixfin - violin
Elizabeth Stewart - bass
Julie Tanner - cello
Alan Umstead - violin
Catherine Umstead - violin
Gary Vanosdale - viola
Mary Kathryn Vanosdale - violin
Karen Winklemann - violin

 Strings and harp (tracks 2, 6, 8)
AWR Music, Chicago - contractor

Strings recorded at Woodland Studios, Nashville, Tennessee, and Chicago Recording Company, Chicago, Illinois
Andy Williams's vocals recorded at Caravell Recording Studio, Branson, Missouri
Mixed at Quad Studios, Recording Arts and 16th Avenue South, Nashville, Tennessee
Edited at Open Door Productions, Old Hickory, Tennessee
Mastered at MasterMix, Nashville, Tennessee

References

Bibliography

1997 Christmas albums
Andy Williams albums
Christmas albums by American artists
Pop Christmas albums
Covers albums